Lenka Faltusová (born 24 June 1979) is a Czech former biathlete. She competed in three events at the 2006 Winter Olympics.

References

External links
 

1979 births
Living people
Biathletes at the 2006 Winter Olympics
Czech female biathletes
Olympic biathletes of the Czech Republic
People from Lanškroun
Sportspeople from the Pardubice Region